Kuruk (also Romanized as Kūrūk and Korūk; also known as Qūryūg) is a village in Zavkuh Rural District, Pishkamar District, Kalaleh County, Golestan Province, Iran. At the 2006 census, its population was 428, in 80 families.

References 

Populated places in Kalaleh County